The 2016 European Karate Championships, the 51st edition, was held at Montpellier in France from 5 to 8 May 2016. A total of 508 competitors from 46 countries participated at the event.

Medalists

Men's competition

Individual

Team

Women's competition

Individual

Team

Medal table

Participating countries

References

External links
 Results

European Karate Championships
International sports competitions hosted by France
European Karate Championships
Sport in Montpellier
Karate competitions in France
2016 in karate
European Karate Championships